Carley Stenson (born 22 September 1982) is an English actress and singer. She is known for her roles as Steph Cunningham in the Channel 4 soap opera Hollyoaks and Harriet Shelton in the BBC soap opera Doctors. For her role as Steph, she received numerous nominations at the British Soap Awards.

Stenson left Hollyoaks in 2010 to focus on musical theatre acting and has since played roles such as Elle Woods in Legally Blonde: The Musical and Fantine in Les Misérables. In 2023, she competed in the fifteenth series of Dancing on Ice.

Early and personal life
Stenson was born on 22 September 1982 in Billinge Higher End, Wigan. As a child, she competed in talent competitions hosted by the St Helens Star. Whilst starring in Legally Blonde: The Musical, she met actor Danny Mac. The pair began dating in 2011, and got married in 2017. In March 2021, the pair announced that they were expecting their first child together. She gave birth to a daughter in June 2021.

Career
Stenson auditioned for the Channel 4 soap opera Hollyoaks, for the role of a friend of the character Zara Morgan (Kelly Greenwood). The audition was successful, but the casting team told her to audition for the role of Steph Cunningham instead, which she received. Stenson joined the cast after leaving secondary school, aged 17. In 2010, she announced that she would be leaving to pursue musical theatre. She recorded versions of "If I Could Turn Back Time" and "About You Now", both of which were featured in separate episodes of Hollyoaks to coincide with the death of her character.

Stenson's theatre work has included London West End theatre appearances as Princess Fiona in Shrek: The Musical; Elle Woods in Legally Blonde: The Musical; and as The Lady of The Lake in Spamalot. In 2015, she independently released a self-titled extended play. Stenson then played Christine Colgate in the 2015 to 2016 UK tour of Dirty Rotten Scoundrels, as well as Fantine in Les Misérables. In April 2021, she joined the cast of the BBC soap opera Doctors as Harriet Shelton. She appeared until September 2021. In 2022, it was announced that Stenson would be competing in the fifteenth series of Dancing on Ice. Partnered with Mark Hanretty, the pair finished in sixth place.

Filmography

Discography

Awards and nominations

References

1982 births
21st-century English actresses
English child actresses
English musical theatre actresses
English soap opera actresses
English stage actresses
English television actresses
Living people
People from Higher End